is a professional footballer currently playing as a forward for Azul Claro Numazu. Born in Canada, Browne represents Japan at youth international level.

Career statistics

Club
.

Notes

References

External links

Noah Kenshin Browne at Mito HollyHock

2001 births
Living people
Canadian people of Japanese descent
Canadian soccer players
Japanese footballers
Japan youth international footballers
Soccer players from Montreal
Association football forwards
J2 League players
J3 League players
Yokohama F. Marinos players
Kamatamare Sanuki players
Mito HollyHock players